"I Need a Man" is a song recorded by British pop music duo Eurythmics. It was written by band members Annie Lennox and David A. Stewart and produced by Stewart. Taken from their sixth album, Savage (1987), the song was released as the third single in the UK and the first single in the United States.

The track is a pop/rock number with an aggressive, commanding vocal performance by Lennox, in which she explains all of the things she does not want in a man ("...and he don't wear a dress!"). The music video was the second part of a series directed by Sophie Muller. Part one, for the song "Beethoven (I Love to Listen To)", ended with Lennox's character leaving her home after transforming herself from a neurotic housewife into a disco vixen à la Marilyn Monroe. Here, the character ends up performing "I Need a Man" in a dimly-lit nightclub.

Chart performance
"I Need a Man" climbed to number twenty-six in the UK singles chart. The first single released from Savage in the U.S., the song peaked at number forty-six on the Billboard Hot 100. The song was paired as a double A-side with "Beethoven" on the American 12 inch single and hit number six on the Hot Dance Club Play chart.

Critical reception
American magazine Cash Box said that "Lennox delivers a sexy, sassy, soulful performance." James Hamilton from Record Mirror wrote in his dance column, "Dreadfully disappointing late period Rolling Stones-style 126bpm snarling empty strutter — a shame they seem so completely to have lost their earlier consistent touch these days". Ro Newton from Smash Hits commented, "Annie Lennox sounds like a desperate woman as she grunts and growls her way through this "raunchy" number which basically says that she (ahem) would like some male company for the night, thank you very much."

Track listings
 7": RCA (UK, GER, AUS)
 "I Need a Man" (LP Version) – 4:23
 "I Need You" (LP Version) – 3:22

 7": RCA (CAN, US)
 "I Need a Man" (7" Edit) – 4:06
 "Heaven" (LP Version) – 3:27

 10": RCA (UK)
 "I Need a Man" (Live Version)* – 4:35
 "I Need a Man" (LP Version) – 4:23
 "I Need You" (LP Version) – 3:22
Note: Live version was recorded at Corbin Hall, 1988

 12": RCA (UK, GER, AUS)
 "I Need a Man" (Macho Mix) – 6:01
 "I Need a Man" (LP Version) – 4:23
 "I Need You" (LP Version) – 3:22

 12": RCA (US)
 "I Need a Man" (Macho Mix) – 6:01
 "I Need a Man" (7" Edit) – 4:06
 "Beethoven (I Love To Listen To)" (Dance Mix) – 4:42
 "Beethoven (I Love To Listen To)" (7" Edit) – 3:47

 CD single: RCA (UK)
 "I Need a Man" (LP Version) – 4:23
 "Missionary Man" (Live Version)* – 5:18
 "I Need You" (LP Version) – 3:52
 "I Need a Man" (Macho Mix) – 6:01
Note: Live version was recorded in Sydney, 1987 and also appears on Live 1983-1989

 Promo CD single: RCA (US)
 "I Need a Man" (7" Edit) – 4:06

Charts

References

External links
YouTube - "I Need a Man" video

1987 songs
1988 singles
Eurythmics songs
RCA Records singles
Songs written by David A. Stewart
Songs written by Annie Lennox
Song recordings produced by Dave Stewart (musician and producer)
Music videos directed by Sophie Muller